Houston Street may refer to:

Streets:
Houston Street, former street in Augusta, Georgia
Houston Street, New York, New York
Houston Street (Dallas), Dallas, Texas
Houston Street (San Antonio), San Antonio, Texas
Houston Street (Savannah, Georgia)

Stations of the New York City Subway and its predecessors:
Houston Street (IND Second Avenue Line)
Houston Street (IRT Broadway – Seventh Avenue Line)
Houston Street (IRT Ninth Avenue Line)
Houston Street (IRT Third Avenue Line)

See also
Houston Street Ferry
Houston Street Line (disambiguation)
Houston (disambiguation)
Houston station (disambiguation)
Huston Street